Khvor Khvor (also Romanized as Khowr Khowr and Khūr Khūr; also known as Khor Khor and Khorkhora) is a village in Shurakat-e Jonubi Rural District, Ilkhchi District, Osku County, East Azerbaijan Province, Iran. At the 2006 census, its population was 790, in 191 families.

References 

Populated places in Osku County